The Reichmann/Reichman family is a Jewish-Canadian family best known for their property empire built through the Olympia and York company which relied on a carefully constructed image and secrecy to obtain billions in loans on property already leveraged to untenable debt loads, loans made by banks on assumptions which ultimately turned out to be wholly unjustified when the Reichmans family company was ultimately shown to be a house of cards and forced into bankruptcy owing more than twice what their family was supposedly worth. 

At the family's peak, their combined wealth was estimated at $13 billion, while unknown to anyone outside the family at the time of this estimation, they were actually in debt owing billions more than the family was supposedly worth to banks and creditors, the fourth-richest family on the planet on paper.  The family's fortunes were found to be wildly overstated relying on bank loans and secrecy until finally they were forced to declare bankruptcy, particularly with the ill-fated Canary Wharf development and their huge debt to banks and creditors, in 1992 with debts of more than $20 billion. Since then, the family's wealth is estimated to be a fraction of the previous estimates but the family's secrecy still makes judging it impossible.

History 
The Reichman(n)s were originally from the small town of Beled, Hungary, but the ambitious Samuel Reichmann moved the family to Vienna, Austria, in 1928 where he became a successful merchant. He and his wife Renée had six children:
 Eva Reichmann (married name Heller; 1923–1984)
 Edward Reichmann (1925–2005)
 Louis Reichmann (1927–2005)
 Albert Reichmann (1929–2022)
 Paul Reichmann (1930–2013)
 Ralph Reichmann (b. 1933)
 Ezriel Reichmann (b.1938)

During the Second World War, the family fled first to Paris, France, and then to the neutral city of Tangier, Morocco, in the 1950s. There, Samuel became a prominent business leader specializing in the currency trade. Renée became a renowned humanitarian aiding victims of the Holocaust, arranging food parcels to be delivered through the Spanish Red Cross to concentration camps such as Theresienstadt and Auschwitz-Birkenau.

Despite the financial success of life in Tangier the family left to avoid the turbulence of Moroccan independence from the French protectorate. Eva settled in London while Edward went to Montreal. There, in 1955, he founded Olympia Flooring and Tile Company to import tiles from Europe. Edward described Montreal fondly, with its large Jewish population and opportunity for profits; soon the rest of the family followed him to Canada in 1956.

Louis joined Edward in Montreal while Albert, Paul, and Ralph settled in Toronto, where they first expanded Edward's tile business but then moved into construction and property development. Samuel was the leader of this business that became known as York Developments. Albert and Paul played a secondary but central role, while Ralph remained in charge of the tile business. In the late 1960s, Edward's Montreal business was faltering and on the verge of collapse. He was only saved from ruin by a bail-out from his younger brothers in Toronto. Embarrassed at this turn of events Edward left Canada for Israel.

In 1969, the family incorporated Olympia & York (O&Y), a privately-held real-estate company entirely controlled by the family; in 1976, the company began operations in the US.

Over time, through successful projects in Toronto and New York, O&Y became the largest property development and management firm in the world in the 1980s, and the Reichmanns one of the world's richest families. (At the family's peak, their combined wealth was estimated at $13bn, making them the fourth-richest family on the planet.) Holdings of O&Y included First Canadian Place, the World Financial Centre in Manhattan, and Canary Wharf in London. In 1980, they bought English Property Corp, one of the largest British developers. In 1981, they bought Abitibi-Price Inc, the world's largest newspaper producer, for $502 million; and in 1985, they acquired the majority interest in Gulf Canada Resources, in the second-largest takeover in Canadian history.

Throughout this time, the family remained strongly committed to their Haredi Judaism.

In the early 1990s, the business empire and family's fortune was brought low by the Canary Wharf project in London. In 1987, British Prime Minister Margaret Thatcher, who had seen the transformation of the World Financial Centre, enlisted Paul to transform the docklands of Canary Wharf into a financial powerhouse. This project proved catastrophic, as banks were reluctant to move three miles east of the City of London. By 1992, O&Y declared bankruptcy in the biggest corporate failure of all time—with debts of $20bn—and the Reichmann fortune was greatly reduced.

In 1997, Albert's son Philip Reichmann and Paul’s son-in-law Frank Hauer relaunched the company as O&Y Properties Inc. and bought back First Canadian Place. Reichmann and Hauer sold their company in 2005. Since then, the family has continued to be involved in tiles and stone, retirement care, and real-estate development deals around the world.

Family tree 

 Samuel Reichmann (1898 – 1975), m. Renée

 Eva Reichmann Heller (1923 – 1984)
 Edward Reichmann (1925, Beled, Hungary – July 2005, Israel)
 Louis Reichmann (b. May 5, 1927, Beled, Hungary – May 25, 2005), m. 1951 to Marika (b. 1933, Békéscsaba, Hungary)
 Albert Reichmann (1929, Vienna, Austria – December 17, 2022, Toronto, Canada)
 Philip Reichmann
 David Reichmann
 Bernice Koenig
 Libby Gross 
 Paul Reichmann (September 27, 1930, Vienna, Austria – October 25, 2013, Toronto, Canada), m. 1955–2013 to Lea Feldman
 Rachel Reichmann, m. Frank Hauer
 Barry Reichmann
 Libby Reichmann
 Vivian Reichmann
 Henry Reichmann
 Ralph Reichmann (b. 1933, Austria)
 Ezriel Reichmann (b. 1938)
 Ari, Sharona, Tamar, Adina 
10 children, 4 daughters-in-law, and 4 grandchildren
 Ari, Tamar, Sharona, Adina

See also 
 Reichmann
 Oberlander Jews

References

External links
 Reichmann family: Paul, Albert, Ralph at The Canadian Encyclopedia

Further reading
 

 
Businesspeople in construction
Business families
Israeli businesspeople
Canadian business families
Canadian businesspeople
English businesspeople
Jewish-Canadian families
Israeli families
Austrian families
Hungarian families
Jewish Hungarian history
Oberlander Jews